Our Impact Will Be Felt is a tribute album by various artists dedicated to Sick of It All, released on May 8, 2007. The album's title is a reference to a line of the song "Built to Last", which appeared on the band's album of the same title.

Track listing
 Rise Against - "Built to Last"
 Unearth - "Clobberin Time/What's Going On"
 Hatebreed - "Rat Pack"
 Madball - "Give Respect"
 Bleeding Through - "We Want the Truth"
 Comeback Kid - "Step Down"
 Ignite - "Cease Fire"
 Bouncing Souls - "Good Lookin' Out"
 Pennywise - "My Life"
 Kill Your Idols - "Friends Like You"
 Sepultura - "Scratch The Surface"
 Himsa - "Maladjusted"
 Most Precious Blood - "Alone"
 First Blood - "Just Look Around"
 Stretch Arm Strong - "Busted"
 Walls of Jericho - "Us Vs. Them"
 The Suicide Machines - "Goatless"
 Bane - "We Stand Alone"
 No Redeeming Social Value - "World Full Of Hate"
 Napalm Death - "Who Sets the Rules"
 Survive - "Blown Away" (Japan bonus track)
 Loyal To The Grave - "Will We Survive" (Japan bonus track)

References

Tribute albums
2007 compilation albums